This is a summary of the electoral history of Sir Robert Stout, Prime Minister of New Zealand, (1884–1887).

Parliamentary elections

1875 by-election

1875 election

1884 election

1887 election

1893 by-election

1893 election

1896 election

References

Bibliography

Stout, Robert